The Honda Fireblade is a family of sport motorcycles manufactured by Honda since 1992. The first model was designed by Tadao Baba.

 CBR900RR, 1992–1995
 CBR919RR, 1996–1999
 CBR929RR, 2000–2001
 CBR954RR, 2002–2003
 CBR1000RR, 2004–2019
 CBR1000RR-R, 2020–present

Set index articles on vehicles
Fireblade
Sport bikes